The New Hope Railroad , formerly and colloquially known as the New Hope and Ivyland Railroad, is a shortline and heritage railroad located in New Hope, Pennsylvania. Today, the railroad operates both steam and diesel powered locomotives and is an associate member of NORAC.

Services

Heritage
The heritage operations utilize both steam and diesel powered locomotives for excursion trips out of New Hope. Regular NHRR excursions typically operate between New Hope and Lahaska, with some occasionally going to Buckingham Valley. The railroad mostly uses former Reading Company passenger cars, which date between 1914 and 1932, for excursions.

Freight
NHRR is involved in the import and export of raw materials and manufactured products. Freight customers range from national chemical companies to consumer product manufacturers. NHRR interchanges with Pennsylvania Northeastern Railroad in Johnsville, which in turn interchanges with CSX Transportation in Lansdale. NHRR's primary customers are based in Warminster; CRC Industries, Castrol and Double H Plastics are served on a weekly basis.

History
The line currently operated by the New Hope Railroad was originally known as the New Hope Branch of the Reading Company (RDG), which leased it to the North Pennsylvania Railroad, of which it was a part. The railroad ran as far as Hartsville Station (near Bristol Road, which eventually became Ivyland) until March 29, 1891, when the line was extended to the long-desired terminal of New Hope, Pennsylvania.

In 1932, steam powered trains above Hatboro were replaced with a Doodlebug after electric service was introduced between Hatboro and Philadelphia. In June 1952, Hatboro-New Hope passenger service terminated. In the early 1960s, the RDG's financial situation was precarious. Looking to rid themselves of unprofitable branch lines via abandonment, a group of train aficionados and businessmen led by Philadelphia attorney Kenneth Souser established Steam Trains, Inc. with the goal of operating steam trains on a for-profit basis. Steam Trains, Inc. became organized as the 'New Hope & Ivyland Railroad (NHIR), and on June 20, 1966, the 16.7-mile line was sold for $200,000.

Steam Trains, Inc. started their operations on a high note, often in an extravagant fashion, with the purchase of four steam locomotives and seven passenger cars. The company leased freight locomotives from RDG, and used only hired labor to operate their excursions. The "air rights" over the Southern portion of the line from Ivyland to just north of Almshouse Road, were sold to the former Philadelphia Electric Company (now Exelon) in order to stay solvent. Due to extremely low ticket prices to generate sales that led to no additional income of riders, Steam Trains, Inc. declared bankruptcy on June 5, 1970. Operations continued under a court-appointed trustee.

The Bucks County Industrial Development Corporation (BCIDC) purchased the trackage from the Steam Trains, Inc. in early 1974 to "preserve rail service through the center of Bucks County." The county selected McHugh Brothers Heavy Hauling, Inc. to operate freight service over the line via a lease agreement. McHugh Brothers continued hauling freight with Edward L. McHugh as president until his departure in 1989. By the summer of 1976, the railroad received state funding to rehabilitate crumbling infrastructure that sorely needed fixing. By August 1977, volunteers from the Buckingham Valley Trolley Association [BVTA] (now the Electric City Trolley Museum Association) were operating state-sponsored passenger service connecting the touristy town of New Hope with SEPTA/Conrail commuter trains at Warminster. Bucks County had made a wise investment, as both passenger and freight service flourished during the 1970s once track upgrades were made. Finally, on June 30, 1979, NHRR finally emerged from its decade-long bankruptcy.

Beginning July 3, 1980, volunteers of the New Hope Steam Railway (NHOP) resumed weekend excursion service after the BVTA decided to end it. The NHOP ran trains under a lease agreement with the BCIDC until 1990, when the line and its equipment were once again in a state of decay and disrepair. The McHugh Bros. operated NHIR until 1989 when their lease ended and the Morristown & Erie was contracted to operate the railroad. The BCIDC sold the line outright to the for-profit Bucks County Railroad Preservation and Restoration Corporation (BCRP&RC) in 1990, who slowly began to rebuild the railroad to its current state of good repair. In 1993, the reporting mark was changed to NHRR. BCRP&RC is the official corporate structure, doing business as the New Hope Railroad.

See also

List of heritage railroads in the United States
Pennsylvania Northeastern Railroad
New Hope Railroad 40

References

External links

New Hope Railroad – Official site
New Hope Railroad Photos
New Hope Railroad at rrpicturearchives.net

Heritage railroads in Pennsylvania
Pennsylvania railroads
Spin-offs of the Reading Company
Tourist attractions in Bucks County, Pennsylvania
1966 establishments in Pennsylvania
Railway companies established in 1966